The Airrow Stealth is a pneumatic air rifle manufactured by Swivel Machine. The Airrow Stealth is chambered in calibres ranging from .177/.22/.25 and capable of firing the likes of darts at a high speed.

References

Air guns of the United States
Pneumatic weapons